The City of Silent Men is a lost 1921 American silent drama film produced by Famous Players-Lasky and distributed by Paramount Pictures. It was directed by Tom Forman and starred Thomas Meighan and Lois Wilson.

Plot
Based upon a summary in a film publication, Jim Montogmery (Meighan) escapes from Sing Sing prison and goes west to start a new life under the name Jack Nelson. He becomes superintendent of a large mill and falls in love with the owner's daughter Molly (Wilson). He tells her of his past life and she believes that he is innocent, so they are married. Prison officials pardon Old Bill (Everton), who planned Jim's escape, as bait in their attempt to recapture Jim. Detective Mike Kearney (MacQuarrie) finally lands his man but Jim places his fingers in the mill machinery to spoil the tell-tale fingerprints. Later Old Bill wins a confession from the crook that actually did the crime for which Jim was sentenced, leading to a pardon for Jim.

Cast
Thomas Meighan - Jim Montogmery
Lois Wilson - Molly Bryant
Kate Bruce - Mrs. Montgomery
Paul Everton - Old Bill
George MacQuarrie - Mike Kearney
Guy Oliver - Mr. Bryant

References

External links

1921 films
American silent feature films
Films directed by Tom Forman
Lost American films
Films based on American novels
Paramount Pictures films
Silent American drama films
American black-and-white films
1921 drama films
1921 lost films
Lost drama films
1920s American films